(Spanish for 'Illustrated Library of Gaspar y Roig') is an editorial collection published by Gaspar y Roig since 1851, in Madrid, Spain, under the direction of .

Overview 
The Biblioteca ilustrada de Gaspar y Roig is a collection of cheap illustrated books of medium quality, with two columns, condensed fonts and narrow margins to reducing costs, and engravings inserted into the text. The folio format is intended for newspaper readers.

All the books begin with an engraving illustration in order to encourage reading, be it an allusion to the fine arts, a printing press, a garden with ladies or some reading gentlemen.

See also 
 El Museo Universal

References 

Editorial collections
Spanish books
Spanish-language books
Illustrated books
Mass media in Madrid
Defunct mass media in Spain
19th-century publications